The five solae (from Latin, lit. "alone"; occasionally Anglicized to five solas) of the Protestant Reformation are a foundational set of Christian theological principles held by theologians and clergy to be central to the doctrines of justification and salvation as taught by the Calvinism and Lutheranism branches of Protestantism, as well as in some sects of Pentecostalism. Each sola represents a key belief in these Protestant traditions in contradistinction to the theological doctrine of the Catholic Church, although they were not assembled as a theological unit until the 20th century. The Reformers are known to have only clearly stated two of the five solae. Even today there are differences as to what constitutes the solae and how many there are, not to mention how to interpret them to reflect the Reformers' beliefs.

History
The solae were not systematically articulated together as a set of five until the 20th century; however, sola gratia and sola fide were used in conjunction by the Reformers themselves. For example, in 1554 Melanchthon wrote, "sola gratia justificamus et sola fide justificamur" ("only by grace do we justify and only by faith are we justified"). All of the solae show up in various writings by the Protestant Reformers, but they are not catalogued together by any.

In 1916, Lutheran scholar Theodore Engelder published an article titled "The Three Principles of the Reformation: Sola Scriptura, Sola Gratia, Sola Fides" ("only scripture, only grace, only faith"). In 1934, theologian Emil Brunner substituted Soli Deo gloriam for Sola Scriptura. In 1958, historian Geoffrey Elton, summarizing the work of John Calvin, wrote that Calvin had "joined together" the "great watchwords". Elton listed sola fide with sola gratia as one term, followed by sola scriptura and soli Deo gloria. Later, in commenting on Karl Barth's theological system, Brunner added Christus solus to the litany of solas while leaving out sola scriptura. The first time the additional two solae are mentioned is in Johann Baptiste Metz's 1965, The Church and the World.

The three solae
In most of the earliest articulations of the solae, three were typically specified: scripture over tradition, faith over works, and grace over merit. Each was intended to represent an important distinction compared with teachings claimed in Catholic doctrine.

Sola scriptura ("by Scripture alone")

Sola Scriptura  is upheld by Lutheran and Reformed theologies and asserts that scripture must govern over church traditions and interpretations which are themselves held to be subject to scripture. All church traditions, creeds, and teachings must be in unity with the teachings of scripture as the divinely inspired Word of God.

The doctrine of Sola Scriptura, in a nutshell, affirms that Scripture is our only source of normative, apostolic, infallible revelation and that “all things necessary for salvation and about faith and life are taught in the Bible with sufficient clarity so that the ordinary believer can find it there and understand it.”

This particular sola is sometimes called the formal principle of the Reformation, since it is the source and norm of the material cause or principle, the gospel of Jesus Christ that is received sola fide (Latin ablative, sōlā fidē, meaning "by faith alone"), sola gratia (Latin ablative, sōlā grātiā, meaning "by grace alone" or by God's favor). The adjective (sola) and the noun (scriptura) are in the ablative case rather than in the nominative case to indicate that the Bible does not stand alone apart from God, but rather that it is the instrument of God by which he reveals himself for salvation through faith in Christ (solus Christus or solo Christo).

It should be emphasized that this doctrine in no way denies tradition, reason or experience as sources of truth. There is nothing in Sola Scriptura that eliminates other authorities, but what it does say is that there is only one authority that can absolutely bind the conscience, and that is: Holy Scripture, and that all controversies about doctrine and Theology must be resolved in the final analysis by Scripture.

Sola fide ("by faith alone")

Sola fide is summarized in the Thirty-nine Articles of the Anglican church, specifically Article XI "Of the Justification of Man":

Bishop Scott J. Jones in United Methodist Doctrine writes that in Methodist theology: 

For Luther, baptism is a work of God by which the forgiveness of sins and salvation earned by Christ's death, and confirmed by Christ's resurrection, are given to the baptized person who believes God's Word that says He is doing exactly that in baptism.
Infant baptism is not only appropriate, but urged: "We bring the child in the conviction and hope that it believes, and we pray that God may grant it faith; but we do not baptize it upon that, but solely upon the command of God."

The Bible talks about the idea of being justified by faith opposed to works,For we hold that one is justified by faith apart from works of the law. Romans 3:28 ESV

For in the gospel the righteousness of God is revealed—a righteousness that is by faith from first to last,[a] just as it is written: “The righteous will live by faith.” Romans 1:17

Sola gratia ("by grace alone")

Sola gratia, or "only grace", specifically excludes the merit done by a person as part of achieving salvation. Sola gratia is the teaching that salvation comes by divine grace or "unmerited favor" only, not as something merited by the sinner. A famous verse used to back up this doctrine isFor it is by grace you have been saved, through faith—and this is not from yourselves, it is the gift of God— 9 not by works, so that no one can boast. Ephesians 2:8-9This means that salvation is an unearned gift from God for Jesus's sake. While some maintain that this doctrine is the opposite of "works' righteousness" and conflicts with some of the aspects of the Roman Catholic doctrine of merit, it might be asserted that this article, taken at face value, conflicts in no way with Roman Catholic teaching.  Both Protestants and Roman Catholics hold the doctrine that grace is truly and always a gift of God. Both agree that God is the sole actor in grace – that grace is always efficacious without any cooperation by man. They differ on whether human action under the influence of grace can cooperate with grace to "merit" greater graces. Protestants follow the doctrine known as monergism, which asserts that God acts alone to save the sinner; the responsibility for salvation does not rest on the sinner to any degree. By contrast, the Roman Catholic view asserts that salvation does involve some form of cooperation between divine grace and human agency. This view is known as synergism.

Protestant Arminians, such as Methodists, are synergists but may also claim the doctrine of sola gratia, though they understand it quite differently than Lutherans and Calvinists do. Arminians believe that God saves only by grace and not at all by merit, but man, enabled by what is referred to as "prevenient grace", is enabled by the Holy Spirit to understand the Gospel and respond in faith. Arminians believe that this is compatible with salvation by grace alone, since all the actual saving is done by grace. Arminians believe that humans are only capable of receiving salvation when first enabled to do so by prevenient grace, which they believe is distributed to everyone. Arminians therefore do not reject the conception of sola gratia expounded by Lutheran and Reformed theologians, although their interpretation of it is quite different.

John Owen, in A Display of Arminianism, rejects the implied belief that the understanding of the Reformed theology has any alliance between the two doctrines and Arminianism is but another form of pelagianism, known as semipelagianism.

The Five Solas

While the Reformers of the 16th century wrote of all five solas in various period writings, they are not all mentioned together in one place and were not systematically brought together until the 20th century.

Solus Christus or Solo Christo ("Christ alone" or "through Christ alone")

Solus Christus, or "only Christ", excludes the priestly class as necessary for sacraments. Solus Christus is the teaching that Christ is the only mediator between God and man, and that there is salvation through no other (hence, the phrase is sometimes rendered in the ablative case, solo Christo, meaning that salvation is "by Christ alone"). 

The Catholic Church teaches that lay people, and even unbaptized people, can validly baptize, and may do so in an emergency, and that the ministers of the sacrament of matrimony are the people getting married, not the priest, who is only a witness to the marriage, although a witness is legally required in the modern Western Catholic church. Other sacraments, according to Catholic doctrine, essentially require a bishop or at least a priest in order to be valid.

With regard to Lutheran theology, while rejecting all other mediators between God and man, classical Lutheranism continues to honor the memory of the Virgin Mary and other exemplary saints. This principle rejects sacerdotalism, the belief that there are no sacraments in the church without the services of priests ordained by apostolic succession. Martin Luther taught the "general priesthood of the baptized", which was modified in later Lutheranism and classical Protestant theology into "the priesthood of all believers", denying the exclusive use of the title "priest" (Latin sacerdos) to the clergy. This principle does not deny the office of the holy ministry to which is committed the public proclamation of the Gospel and the administration of the sacraments. In this way, Luther in his Small Catechism could speak of the role of "a confessor" to confer sacramental absolution on a penitent; the section in this catechism known as "The Office of the Keys" (not written by Luther but added with his approval) identifies the "called ministers of Christ" as being the ones who exercise the binding and loosing of absolution and excommunication through Law and Gospel ministry. 

This binding and loosing is laid out in the Lutheran formula of holy absolution: the "called and ordained servant of the Word" forgives penitents' sins (speaks Christ's words of forgiveness: "I forgive you all your sins") without any addition of penances or satisfactions and not as an interceding or mediating "priest", but "by virtue of [his] office as a called and ordained servant of the Word" and "in the stead and by the command of [his] Lord Jesus Christ". In this tradition absolution reconciles the penitent with God directly through faith in Christ's forgiveness rather than with the priest and the church as mediating entities between the penitent and God.

Soli Deo gloria ("glory to God alone")

Soli Deo gloria, or "glory to God alone", stands in opposition to the veneration perceived by many to be present in the Roman Catholic Church of Mary the mother of Jesus, the saints, or angels. Soli Deo gloria is the teaching that all glory is to be due to God alone, since salvation is accomplished solely through His will and action – not only the gift of the all-sufficient atonement of Jesus on the cross, but also the gift of faith in that atonement, created in the heart of the believer by the Holy Spirit. Some Reformers believed that human beings – even saints canonized by the Roman Catholic Church, the popes, and the ecclesiastical hierarchy – are not worthy of the glory that was accorded them; that is, one should not exalt such humans for their good works, but rather praise and give glory to God.

Additional Solas
More recently, certain scholars have suggested that there should be additional solas on the list: Sola ecclesia ("the Church alone"), Sola caritas ("Charitable-love alone") and Sola Spiritus (In the "Spirit alone"). At the other end of the spectrum, emerging from the Imiaslavie and Primitive Catholicism streams, some Christians now affirm the “Sōlum Nōmen” position that the Holy “Name Alone” is All-sufficient, based upon the insight Jesus is “the one name that contains everything”.

See also

Ecclesia semper reformanda est

References

External links
From a conservative Calvinistic perspective
FiveSolas.com – a Reformed page devoted to the Solas
"What do Lutherans believe?" – a Lutheran Church – Missouri Synod exposition of three of the solas

Reformed Theology, by R. Michael Allen, Continuum International Publishing Group, 2010, p. 77

 
Christian terminology
Latin religious words and phrases